A list of films produced in the United Kingdom in 1975 (see 1975 in film):

1975

See also
1975 in British music
1975 in British radio
1975 in British television
1975 in the United Kingdom

References

External links
 

1975
Films
British